The 2006 PTT Bangkok Open was a women's professional tennis tournament played on outdoor hard courts. It was the second edition of the PTT Bangkok Open and was part of the WTA Tier III tournaments on the 2006 WTA Tour. It took place at the Rama Gardens Hotel in Bangkok, Thailand from 9  October through 15 October 2006. Unseeded Vania King won the singles title.

Singles main-draw entrants

Seeds 

1 Rankings as of October 2, 2006

Other entrants 
The following players received wildcards into the main draw:
 Nudnida Luangnam
 Tamarine Tanasugarn
 Suchanun Viratprasert

The following players received entry from the qualifying draw:
 Mariana Díaz Oliva
 Hsieh Su-wei
 Yan Zi
 Yuan Meng

The following players received entry as a lucky loser:
 Ryōko Fuda
 Erika Takao

Doubles main-draw entrants

Seeds 

1 Rankings are as of October 2, 2006

Champions

Singles 

  Vania King def.  Tamarine Tanasugarn 2–6, 6–4, 6–4

Doubles 
  Vania King /  Jelena Kostanić def.  Mariana Díaz Oliva /  Natalie Grandin 7–5, 2–6, 7–5

References

External links 
 
 ITF link 

 
 WTA Tour
 in women's tennis
Tennis, WTA Tour, PTT Bangkok Open
Tennis, WTA Tour, PTT Bangkok Open
Tennis, WTA Tour, PTT Bangkok Open

Tennis, WTA Tour, PTT Bangkok Open